Goblini (The Goblins) is the debut album by the Serbian punk rock band Goblini released by Music YUser independent record label in 1994. The album, available in its entirety only on compact cassette, was partially rereleased as bonus tracks on the 1998 CD reissue of Istinite priče I deo, for which some of the tracks from the debut were rerecorded due to the band's dissatisfaction with the album production.

Track listing

Rock side

Roll side

Personnel 
 Vlada Kokotović — bass, backing vocals
 Nenad Divnić "Kića" — drums 
 Alen Jovanović — guitar, backing vocals
 Branko Golubović "Golub" — vocals
 Predrag Pejić — producer, recorded by
 Aleksandra & Aleksandra — vocals on B5
 Miša Bogunović — artwork by [design]

References 
 EX YU ROCK enciklopedija 1960-2006, Janjatović Petar; 

1994 debut albums
Goblini albums